Mount Ragang, also called Mount Piapayungan and Blue Mountain by the local people, is an active stratovolcano on Mindanao island in the Philippines.

Location
Mount Ragang is located on south of Lanao del Sur in the Bangsamoro autonomous region.

Physical features

It is the most active volcano on Mindanao, and is part of a string of volcanoes in what volcanologists call the Central Mindanao Arc. It is one of the active volcanoes in the Philippines, which are all part of the Pacific ring of fire.

Eruptions
There is still some confusion on the number of times Ragang has erupted. The Philippine Institute of Volcanology and Seismology lists eight eruptions, with the last one occurring in July 1916. However, the Smithsonian Institution's Global Volcanology Programs, citing the Catalog of Active Volcanoes of the World (Neumann van Padang, 1953), suggests that some eruptions attributed to nearby Makaturing were those of Ragang.

See also
 List of mountains in the Philippines
 List of Ultras of the Philippines
 List of Southeast Asian mountains
 List of active volcanoes in the Philippines
 List of potentially active volcanoes in the Philippines
 List of inactive volcanoes in the Philippines
 Philippine Institute of Volcanology and Seismology

References

External links
 Philippine Institute of Volcanology and Seismology (PHIVOLCS) Ragang Volcano Page
 "Mount Piapayungan, Philippines" on Peakbagger

Mountains of the Philippines
Stratovolcanoes of the Philippines
Subduction volcanoes
Volcanoes of Mindanao
Landforms of Lanao del Sur
Active volcanoes of the Philippines
Holocene stratovolcanoes